is the first maxi single by Japanese group Dragon Ash, released in 1998. The single's title track was the opening theme to the 1998 anime DT Eightron.

The Cowboy Fuck! remix is listed on the single as "ft. DJ BOTS" because, at the time, BOTS was not a permanent member of the group (he joined in 1999).

"陽はまたのぼりくりかえす" (Hi wa Mata Nobori Kurikaesu) sampled drums from "We Will Rock You" by Queen.

Track listing
"陽はまたのぼりくりかえす" (Hi wa Mata Nobori Kurikaesu) – 7:13
"Don't Worry 'bout Me" – 4:23
"Cowboy Fuck!" feat DJ Bots" – 5:07

1998 singles
Dragon Ash songs